, also known as Jōdo Buddhism, is a branch of Pure Land Buddhism derived from the teachings of the Japanese ex-Tendai monk Hōnen.  It was established in 1175 and is the most widely practiced branch of Buddhism in Japan, along with Jōdo Shinshū. In the general classification of Buddhism in Japan, the Jōdo-shū, the Jōdo Shinshu, the Ji-shu and the Yuzu Nembutsu shu are collectively classified into the lineage of Jōdo Buddhism. (Jōdo kei, 浄土系)

History

The Founder: Hōnen 

Hōnen (法然) was born in 1133, the son of Uruma no Tokikuni of a local ruling family in Mimasaka Province. Hōnen was originally named Seishimaru after the mahāsattva Seishi (Sanskrit Mahāsthāmaprāpta). After a rival official assassinated his father in 1141, Hōnen was initiated into his uncle's monastery at the age of 9. From then on, Hōnen lived his life as a monk and eventually studied at the famous monastery of Mount Hiei.

Hōnen was well respected for his knowledge and for his adherence to the Five Precepts, but in time, Hōnen became dissatisfied with the Tendai teachings he learned at Mount Hiei. Influenced by the writings of Shandao, Hōnen devoted himself solely to Amitābha as expressed through the practice of nembutsu.

In time, Hōnen gathered disciples from all walks of life, and developed a large following, notably women, who had been excluded from serious Buddhist practice up to this point. This included fishermen, prostitutes and fortune tellers.  Hōnen also distinguished himself by not discriminating against women who were menstruating, who were thought at the time to be unclean.  All of this caused concern among the religious and political elite of Kyoto and eventually Emperor Go-Toba issued a decree in 1207 to have Hōnen exiled to a remote part of Japan and given a criminal's name. Some of Hōnen's followers were executed, while others, including Benchō, Ryukan and Shinran, were exiled to other regions of Japan away from Hōnen.

Eventually, Hōnen was pardoned and returned to Kyoto in 1211, but died soon after in 1212, just two days after writing his famous One-Sheet Document.

After Hōnen 

Because Hōnen and his disciples were largely exiled to remote provinces, and due to differences in background and monastic training, the teachings began to take on regional differences.  Some sub-sects died out quickly, while others survive through the modern era.  The main branch of Jōdo Shū started under Hōnen's disciple Benchō, who was exiled to Chinzei on the island of Kyushu. There, Benchō actively preached Hōnen's doctrine while refuting what he considered deviations taught by other disciples (particularly Kosai's controversial "once-calling" teaching).

Another monk named Ryōchū became his disciple for a year, and then spread Benchō's and Hōnen's teachings throughout Japan before reaching the capital at Kamakura. Ryōchū helped to legitimize the "Chinzei branch" of Jōdo Shū as the mainstream one, and is credited as the 3rd Patriarch accordingly. He also referred to Benchō, his teacher, as the 2nd Patriarch after Hōnen.  Ryōchū also met with Renjaku-bo, whose own teacher Genchi, had been another disciple of Hōnen. Renjaku-bo felt that Genchi and Benchō had been in complete agreement, so he willingly united his lineage with Ryōchū's, helping to further increase its standing.

Jōdo Shū through the Chinzei lineage continued to develop until the 8th Patriarch, Shōgei (聖冏, 1341-1420) who formalized the training of priests (rather than training under Tendai or Shingon lineages), thus formally establishing it as an independent sect.

Doctrine 

Jōdo-shū is heavily influenced by the idea of Mappō or the "Age of Dharma Decline".  The concept of Mappō is that over time society becomes so corrupt that people can no longer effectively put the teachings of the Buddha into practice anymore.  In medieval thought, signs of Mappō included warfare, natural disasters and corruption of the sangha.

The Jōdo-shū school was founded near the end of the Heian period, when Buddhism in Japan had become deeply involved in political schemes, and some in Japan saw monks flaunting wealth and power.  At the end of the Heian, warfare broke out between competing samurai clans, while people suffered from earthquakes and series of famines.

Hōnen sought to provide people a simple Buddhist practice that anybody could use toward enlightenment, no matter how degenerate the times. He taught devotion to Amitābha as expressed in the repetition of his name - "Namo Amida Bu"- known as the nembutsu. Through Amitābha's compassion a being could be reborn in the pure land (Sanskrit Sukhavati) where they could pursue enlightenment more readily.

Hōnen did not believe that other Buddhist practices were wrong, but rather, they were not practical on a wide-scale, especially during the difficult times of the late Heian.

Repetition of the nembutsu is the most fundamental practice of Jōdo-shū, which derives from the Primal Vow of Amitābha. In home practice, or in temple liturgy, the nembutsu may be recited in any number of styles including:
  - reciting the nembutsu ten times, with the last drawn out.
  - reciting the nembutsu as many times as possible in a sitting, regardless of number.
  - a style involving three drawn-out recitations of the nembutsu, followed by a bow.  This is repeated twice more for a total of nine recitations.

However, in addition to this, practitioners are encouraged to engage in "auxiliary" practices, such as observing the Five Precepts, meditation, the chanting of sutras and other good conduct. There is no strict rule on this however, as Jōdo-shū stresses that the compassion of Amitābha is extended to all beings who recite the nembutsu, so how one observes auxiliary practices is left to the individual to decide.

The Infinite Life Sutra is the central Buddhist scripture for Jōdo-shū Buddhism, and the foundation of the belief in the Primal Vow of Amitābha. In addition to this, the Amitāyurdhyāna Sūtra and the Amitabha Sutra are important to the Jōdo-shū school. Most of what is known about Honen and his thought is attributed through sayings collected in the following century, the Senchakushū, and letters to his students and disciples.

Jōdo-shū, like other Buddhist schools, maintains a professional, monastic priesthood, who help to lead the congregation, and also maintain the well-known temples such as Chion-in. The head of the Jōdo-shū school is called the monshu in Japanese, and lives at the head temple of Chion-in, Kyoto, Japan.

Sub-sects 

The main 'Chinzei' branch of Jodo Shu was maintained by the so-called "Second Patriarch" and disciple of Honen, Benchō.  However, other disciples of Hōnen branched off into a number of other sects and interpretations, particularly after they were exiled in 1207:

 Shoku founded the Seizan branch, which structured the Buddhist teachings into a hierarchy with the nembutsu at the top.  Because his teachings were compatible with the dominant Tendai sect, Shoku was not exiled.
 Ryukan, one of Honen's more elderly disciples, emphasized the efficacy of the nembutsu as practice and encouraged its frequent recitation, leading to his teachings being called the "many callings school" or tanen-gi (多念義).  He was exiled to eastern Japan where he died en route.
 Kōsai taught the idea that a single recitation of the nembutsu was all that was necessary. His doctrine of "once-calling" or ichinen-gi (一念義) provided considerable controversy, and Honen eventually disavowed Kōsai and his teachings.  He was later exiled to the island of Shikoku.
 Chosai, the last of Hōnen's direct disciples, felt that all practices in Buddhism would lead to birth in the Pure Land.
 Awanosuke, the fortune-teller, is credited with the double-stranded Buddhist prayer beads used in Jōdo-shū, though he did not establish a branch of his own.

Another disciple, Shinran, founded Jōdo Shinshū, which diverges somewhat doctrinally, but otherwise is heavily influenced by Hōnen and his teachings.  In Jōdo Shinshū, Hōnen is considered the Seventh Patriarch. Depending on the viewpoint, Shinran and Jōdo Shinshū can be considered another branch of Jōdo-shū.

Geographic distribution 
Although Jōdo-shū is mainly found in Japan, a sizable Jōdo-shū community exists in Hawaii as well as a few temples in the continental United States.

References

Literature
 Blum, Mark L. The Origins and Development of Pure Land Buddhism: a Study and Translation of Gyōnen's Jōdo Hōmon Genrushō. Oxford, New York, Oxford University Press, 2002.
 Matsunaga, Daigan, and Alicia Matsunaga. Foundation of Japanese buddhism, Vol. 2: The Mass Movement (Kamakura and Muromachi Periods). Los Angeles, Tokyo, Buddhist Books International, 1990.
 The Three Pure Land Sutras. Rev. 2nd ed. Translated by Hisao Inagaki with Harold Stewart, Numata Center for Buddhist Translation and Research, 2003.  PDF

External links 
 English Language Site for Jodo Shu - The official website for Jodo Shu.  Also contains information on Pure Land Buddhism in general.
 The Jodo Shu Research Institute - Responsible for providing research and English-language resources on Jodo Shu, as well as publications.

 
1175 establishments in Asia
Schools of Buddhism founded in Japan
Pure Land Buddhism
12th-century establishments in Japan